The Nokia 8 Sirocco (TA-1005) is a high-end smartphone running the Android One variant of Android. It was introduced at MWC in February 2018, and named after the Nokia 8800 Sirocco. The successor of the Nokia 8 Sirocco is the Nokia 9 PureView.

Specifications

Hardware
Compared to the original Nokia 8, the Sirocco edition uses a glass body with stainless steel instead of aluminium. It also has a new camera, a fingerprint sensor at the back instead of the front, 6 GB of RAM instead of 4 GB, omission of the CTIA headphone jack in favour of USB-C, a 5.5" OLED screen rather than a 5.3" LCD, Qi wireless charging, and a larger battery capacity. The device has a Snapdragon 835 like its predecessor.

The display is curved, but the phone lacks palm rejection technology which is found in other curved smartphones. The 8 Sirocco is the very first Nokia device featuring IP67 water resistance, which was never found in earlier Nokia phones including Lumia series.

Software
The Nokia 8 Sirocco ships with Android Oreo and can be updated to Android 10.

Reception
The Nokia 8 Sirocco received mixed to positive reviews. Daniel Van Boom of CNET praised the device, stating that "The Nokia 8 Sirocco is fast, feels sturdy, has a long battery life and runs the sleek Android One operating system." while noting that "It lacks any standout features to justify its premium pricing. The Nokia 8 Sirocco's camera isn't reliable enough, and its design, while improved over the regular Nokia 8, feels stout and a little outdated". Sandra Vogel of ZDNet also praised the phone’s "Solid steel frame, Android One ensuring 2 years of updates, 128GB of internal storage and IP67 rating for dust/water resistance" while criticising the "poor implementation of a curved screen and 16:9 ratio display".

References

8 Sirocco
Mobile phones introduced in 2018
Mobile phones with multiple rear cameras
Mobile phones with 4K video recording
Discontinued smartphones